Yvette Marie Davids (born 29 March 1967) is a United States Navy rear admiral.  She is the first Hispanic American woman to command a Navy ship.

Early life and education
Yvette Marie Gonzalez grew up in San Antonio, Texas. She graduated with a B.S. in Oceanography from the United States Naval Academy in 1989 and was commissioned as an ensign. While studying at the Naval Academy she earned All-America Crew honors in Intercollegiate Sailing for both 1987 and 1989. She later received an M.A. in National Security and Strategic Studies from the Naval War College in 2002 and an M.S. in National Resource Strategy from the Industrial College of the Armed Forces in 2012.

Career
Yvette Davids served as executive officer of the destroyers USS Higgins (DDG-76) and USS Benfold (DDG-65). She later commanded the frigate USS Curts (FFG-38) from April 2007 to November 2008, becoming the first Hispanic American woman to command a Navy warship.

Yvette Davids assumed command of the cruiser USS Bunker Hill (CG-52) from Capt. Michael J. Ford in San Diego on 8 November 2012. She was relieved of command by Capt. Sterling W. Dawley in Singapore on 3 October 2014.

Her promotion to rear admiral (lower half) was authorized by the U.S. Senate on 25 May 2017. Yvette Davids served as senior military advisor to the Assistant Secretary of State for Political-Military Affairs. Davids assumed command of Carrier Strike Group 11 in May 2019. She was succeeded by Rear Admiral James A. Kirk in May 2020. Her promotion to rear admiral (upper half) had been approved by the Senate on 20 March 2020.

In May 2022, it was announced that Davids would be assigned as special assistant to the director of the Navy Staff, simultaneously serving as director of the Learning to Action Drive Team.

Personal
Yvette Davids is the daughter of William E. Gonzalez and Magda Margarita (Matos) Gonzalez.

Yvette Davids is married to Rear Admiral Keith B. Davids, a 1990 Naval Academy graduate and Navy SEAL officer. They have twin sons. As of August 2022, her husband, RADM Keith Davids, was serving as the commander of Naval Special Warfare Command (NAVSPECWARCOM).

References

External links

1967 births
Living people
People from Bexar County, Texas
United States Naval Academy alumni
Naval War College alumni
Dwight D. Eisenhower School for National Security and Resource Strategy alumni
Recipients of the Legion of Merit
Female admirals of the United States Navy
United States Navy rear admirals (upper half)
21st-century American women
Military personnel from Texas